Benoît Poilvet (born 27 August 1976 in Saint-Brieuc) is a French professional road bicycle racer. He rode for UCI ProTeam Crédit Agricole between 2000 and 2007. For the 2008 season he joined the continental team Bretagne Armor Lux, with whom when the team was an amateur team he had raced. In May 2008, Poilvet took his first professional race victory with stage 5 of the Tour de Bretagne Cycliste. Poilvet also took the leader's jersey which he would keep to win the race.

Major results

 Critérium International - Mountains Classification (2003)
 1st stage 5 & overall Tour de Bretagne Cycliste

References

External links 
Profile at Crédit Agricole official website

1976 births
Living people
French male cyclists
Sportspeople from Saint-Brieuc
Cyclists from Brittany